Crash is a 1996 psychological drama film written, produced and directed by David Cronenberg, based on J. G. Ballard's 1973 novel of the same name. Starring James Spader, Deborah Kara Unger, Elias Koteas, Holly Hunter and Rosanna Arquette, it follows a film producer who, after surviving a car crash, becomes involved with a group of symphorophiliacs who are aroused by car crashes, and tries to rekindle his sexual relationship with his wife.

The film premiered at the Cannes Film Festival, where it received the Special Jury Prize, a unique award that is distinct from the Jury Prize as it is not given annually, but only at the request of the official jury (for example, the previous year, both a Jury Prize and a Special Jury Prize were awarded). When then-jury president Francis Ford Coppola announced the award "for originality, for daring and for audacity", he stated that it had been a controversial choice and that certain jury members "did abstain very passionately". It continued to receive various accolades, including six Genie Awards from the Academy of Canadian Cinema and Television, including awards for Cronenberg as director and screenwriter; the film was also nominated in two further categories, including Best Picture.

The film's initial release was met with intense controversy and opened to highly divergent reactions from critics; some praised the film for its daring premise and originality, others aimed criticism for having such a strange premise filled with graphic violence. It has since developed a cult following.

Plot
Film producer James Ballard and his detached wife Catherine are in an open marriage. The couple engage in various trysts but, between them, have unenthusiastic sex. Their arousal is heightened by discussing the intimate details of their extramarital sex. She recounts sex that day with a stranger in a prop plane hangar. She was, however, left unsatisfied. When James replies he did not achieve satisfaction during his sexual encounter with one of his coworkers, Catherine replies, "maybe the next one".

While driving home from work late one night, James' car collides head-on with another, killing its male passenger. While trapped in the fused wreckage, Dr. Helen Remington, the driver and the dead passenger's wife, exposes a breast to James when she pulls off the shoulder harness of her seat belt.

While recovering, James meets Helen again, as well as a man named Dr. Robert Vaughan, who takes a keen interest in the brace holding James's shattered leg together and photographs it. While leaving the hospital, Helen and James begin an affair, one primarily fueled by their shared experience of the car crash. Attempting to understand why they are so aroused by their car wreck, they go to witness one of Vaughan's cult meetings/performance pieces, during which he thoroughly re-creates the car crash that killed James Dean with authentic cars and stunt drivers. When Department of Transport officials break up the event, James flees with Helen and Vaughan.

James soon becomes one of Vaughan's followers who fetishize car crashes, obsessively watching car safety test videos, photographing traffic collisions, and recounting the deaths of famous people in road accidents. Catherine, whom Vaughan has followed in his car on several occasions, begins to fantasize about him and James having sex. Although Vaughan initially claims that he is interested in the "reshaping of the human body by modern technology", his actual project is living out the philosophy that the car crash is a "benevolent psychopathology that beckons towards us".

James drives Vaughan's Lincoln convertible around the city while Vaughan picks up and has sex with a prostitute in the back seat. A short time later, James invites Catherine on one of his and Vaughan's drives. On an interstate, they come across a car wreck involving Colin Seagrave, a member of the group, who had been planning to authentically recreate the car accident that killed Jayne Mansfield with Vaughan. Amongst the wreckage, the three see Colin's bloodied corpse, wearing a dress and a blonde wig to accurately resemble Mansfield. Vaughan photographs the wreck as they pass by. Afterward, when police search Vaughan's convertible regarding a pedestrian hit-and-run, James drives it through a car wash while Vaughan and Catherine have sex in the back seat.

James subsequently has another dalliance with Gabrielle, another of the group members whose legs are clad in restrictive steel braces and who has a vulva-like scar on the back of one of her thighs, an injury suffered in a crash. Later, Vaughan invites James to visit a tattooist who tattoos car emblems on Vaughan's body. Afterward, James and Vaughan, both highly aroused, have anal sex in Vaughan's car.

Vaughan and James go for a drive in separate cars, aggressively pursuing each other. On an overpass, Vaughan intentionally crashes his car, landing on a passenger bus below, killing himself. After Vaughan's death, Gabrielle and Helen visit a junkyard, and affectionally embrace while lying in the wreck of Vaughan's car.

Later, James and Catherine perform a similar stunt, with James pursuing her on a freeway at a high speed. Catherine unbuckles her seatbelt as she sees James approaching, and he rams into the back of her car, forcing it to topple down into a grass median. James exits his car and approaches Catherine's, which has flipped upside down. Catherine lies partly under the car, apparently superficially injured. When James asks if she is okay, she tells him she is not hurt. As the couple kiss and begin to have sex near the wrecked vehicle, James whispers to her, "maybe the next one", implying that the only possible result of their extreme fetish is death.

Cast

Production
The film was an international co-production between the British company Recorded Picture Company, and Canadian companies Alliance Communications Corporation, The Movie Network, and Telefilm Canada.

Themes
For Cronenberg, technology, including the production of automobiles, is the product of the human mind and a kind of natural extension of the human body. He revisits his favorite subject, how modern technology affects people and their sex life, in Crash. He noted that a moment has come in the history of mankind when sex-free artificial reproduction of the species became available: "We could literally put a moratorium on sex for 100 years and we still would not extinguish the human race." The director wonders what the place of sex is in these new conditions.

The novel depicts the world of mankind so alienated and jaded that communication and emotions are possible only through traumatic experiences, such as a car accident. In the fantasy, semi-abstract world of Ballard and Cronenberg, the vectors of thanatos and eros coincide in a single act of intercourse through man-made technology. Jonathan Rosenbaum notes that in the film, human skin is likened to the glitzy, fetishized surface of cars; the camera slides seamlessly from one to the other. The "chosen ones", a secret society that reads like a fight club in Palahniuk's novel, perceive vehicles and accidents as a fetish.

Release

Restorations 
Two 4K restorations were released in 2020 by Arrow Films and The Criterion Collection.

Controversies
The film was controversial, as was the book, because of its vivid depictions of graphic sexual acts instigated by violence.

At the Cannes Film Festival, a screening provoked boos and angry bolts by upset viewers. In a 2020 interview, Cronenberg stated that he believed Francis Ford Coppola, the jury president at the 1996 Cannes Film Festival, was so vehemently opposed to Crash that other jury members in favor of the film banded together to present Cronenberg with a rare Special Jury Prize. So great was Coppola's distaste for the film that, according to Cronenberg, Coppola refused to personally present the award to the director.

The controversial subject matter prompted The Daily Mail and The Evening Standard to orchestrate an aggressive campaign to ban Crash in the United Kingdom. In response to this outcry, the British Board of Film Classification (BBFC) inquired with a Queen's Counsel and a psychologist, none of whom found any justification to ban it, and 11 disabled people, who saw no offense with its portrayal of the physically challenged. Seeing no evidence for a ban, Crash was passed by the BBFC uncut with an 18 rating in March 1997.

A theater manager in Oslo, Norway, banned the film at her location. She denied it was related to a traffic accident that left her husband paralysed.

Media mogul Ted Turner, whose company oversaw U.S. distributor Fine Line Features, refused to release the film in the United States, going so far as to pull it from an October 1996 release date intended to coincide with the Canadian rollout. Cronenberg would later confirm that a Fine Line executive shared the rumor that Turner's distaste for the movie was the reason for its delay. He said Turner was morally offended and concerned about "copycat incidents". The film eventually received a U.S. release in Spring 1997.

AMC Entertainment Inc., the second-largest U.S. theater chain at the time, said it was posting security guards outside about 30 screens showing the movie to ensure minors did not get inside. At AMC's Century City location in Los Angeles, two security guards were present, one inside the auditorium and one outside.

The film was still banned by Westminster Council, meaning it could not be shown in any cinema in the West End, even though they had earlier given special permission for the film's premiere, and it was easily seen in nearby Camden. In the United States, the film was released in both NC-17 and R versions. In Australia, a cut version rated R18+ was given a limited release; it was later released uncut on VHS in early 1997, and then on DVD in 2003. The American NC-17 version was advertised with the tagline "The most controversial film in years".

An academic study of the controversy and audience responses to it, written by Martin Barker, Jane Arthurs and Ramaswami Harindranath, was published by Wallflower Press in 2001, entitled The Crash Controversy: Censorship Campaigns and Film Reception.

Critical reception
The consensus reads: "Despite the surprisingly distant, clinical direction, Crash's explicit premise and sex is classic Cronenberg territory." On Metacritic, the film's score is listed as 53 out of 100, as determined by 23 critics, signifying "mixed or average reviews".

In his contemporary review, Roger Ebert gave the film 3.5 out of 4 stars, writing:

"Crash" is about characters entranced by a sexual fetish that, in fact, no one has. Cronenberg has made a movie that is pornographic in form, but not in result ... [Crash is] like a porno movie made by a computer: It downloads gigabytes of information about sex, it discovers our love affair with cars, and it combines them in a mistaken algorithm. The result is challenging, courageous and original—a dissection of the mechanics of pornography. I admired it, although I cannot say I "liked" it.

J. Hoberman praised the film highly, noting the melancholy overtones and unconventional dry humor that includes cars mimicking human sexual activity or vice versa (for instance, "a close-up of an automatic car window slowly rising, the running-gag equation of tailgating and rear-entry intercourse"). BBC film critic Mark Kermode has described Crash as "pretty much perfect" and praised Howard Shore's score, while admitting that it's a "hard film to like" and describing the cast's performances as "glacial".

In 2000, a poll done by The Village Voice of film critics listed Crash as the 35th Best Film of the 1990s. A similar poll done by Cahiers du cinéma placed it 8th. In 2005 the staff of Total Film listed it at #21 on their list of the all-time greatest films. Slant Magazine selected it as one of their "100 Essential Films".

In 2002, Parveen Adams, an academic who specializes in art/film/performance and psychoanalysis, argued that the flat texture of the film, achieved through various cinematic devices, prevent the viewer from identifying with the characters in the way one might with a more mainstream film. Instead of vicariously enjoying the sex and injury, the viewer finds himself a disimpassioned voyeur. Adams additionally noted that the scars borne by the characters are old and bloodless—in other words, the wounds lack vitality. The wound is "not traumatizing" but, rather, "a condition of our psychical and social life".

In a 1996 interview with the Vancouver Sun, Cronenberg said Italian film director Bernardo Bertolucci told him "the film was a religious masterpiece." On At the Movies with Roger Ebert, director Martin Scorsese ranked Crash as the eighth best film of the decade.

Of the adaptation, author J. G. Ballard reportedly said, "The movie is actually better than the book. It goes further than the book, and is much more powerful and dynamic. It's terrific." He promoted Cronenberg's work in his native country.

Awards and nominations
The film was nominated for the Golden Palm at the 1996 Cannes Film Festival. In the end, it won the Special Jury Prize. Cannes jury president Francis Ford Coppola noted that "certain (jury) members did abstain very passionately" from endorsing Cronenberg's film, but added that it was important to give Crash an award, "even though in mining some truth of the human condition it offended (certain viewers)". However, other accounts have suggested it was Coppola himself who didn't like the film, with producer Jeremy Thomas later saying, "It touched a nerve with him." In a 2020 interview for the film's 4K restoration, Cronenberg said Coppola was the main dissent on the support for the film on the Cannes jury, adding that "he wouldn't hand me the award" and got someone else to do it.

At the 1997 Stinkers Bad Movie Awards, the film was filed under the Founders Award, which lamented the year's biggest studio disgraces, and stated, "How Oscar winner Holly Hunter and the usually reliable James Spader and Rosanna Arquette got suckered into this mess is a mystery."

See also 
Titane - the 2021 Palme d'Or winner similar in content
 Extreme cinema

References

Further reading

External links
 
 
 
 
 
Crash: The Wreck of the Century an essay by Jessica Kiang at the Criterion Collection

1996 films
1996 drama films
1996 independent films
1996 LGBT-related films
1996 thriller films
1990s erotic drama films
1990s erotic thriller films
1990s psychological drama films
1990s psychological thriller films
1990s thriller drama films
Adultery in films
British erotic drama films
British erotic thriller films
British independent films
British LGBT-related films
British psychological drama films
British psychological thriller films
British thriller drama films
Canadian erotic drama films
Canadian erotic thriller films
Canadian independent films
Canadian LGBT-related films
Canadian psychological drama films
Canadian psychological thriller films
Canadian thriller drama films
1990s English-language films
English-language Canadian films
Films about automobiles
Films based on British novels
Films based on works by J. G. Ballard
Films directed by David Cronenberg
Films produced by Jeremy Thomas
HanWay Films films
Recorded Picture Company films
Films scored by Howard Shore
Films set in Toronto
Films shot in Toronto
LGBT-related thriller drama films
LGBT-related controversies in film
Obscenity controversies in film
Rating controversies in film
Films about self-harm
Swedish-language films
1990s Canadian films
1990s British films